Loïc Lumbilla-Kandja (born 12 May 1987) is a French former professional footballer who played as a forward.

Career
Lumbilla started his career at Paris FC. In July 2004, along with Tijani Belaid, they were signed for Internazionale's Youth Sector. 
In the next season he played for Inter's under-20 team in Campionato Nazionale Primavera. He also played numbers of friendlies for the first team.

In the 2006–07 season, he left on loan to Legnano of Serie C2, where he won the championship.

He then left for FC Locarno of Swiss Challenge League, where he played nine matches.

In January 2009, he signed a contract with Écija Balompié of Spanish Segunda División B.

In August 2009, he signed a two-year contract with VfL Wolfsburg, rejoining former teammate Obafemi Martins.

After few years playing outside Europe, Lumbilla returned to Europe for Maltese club Hamrun Spartans in January 2013.

Personal life
Born in France, Lumbilla has Congolese origins.

Honours
 Coppa Italia Primavera: 2006
 Serie C2: 2007

References

External links
 
 
 

Living people
1987 births
Sportspeople from Saint-Denis, Seine-Saint-Denis
French footballers
French sportspeople of Democratic Republic of the Congo descent
Association football forwards
Swiss Challenge League players
Segunda División B players
Regionalliga players
Maltese Premier League players
Paris FC players
Inter Milan players
A.C. Legnano players
FC Locarno players
VfL Wolfsburg II players
Ħamrun Spartans F.C. players
French expatriate footballers
French expatriate sportspeople in Italy
Expatriate footballers in Italy
French expatriate sportspeople in Switzerland
Expatriate footballers in Switzerland
French expatriate sportspeople in Spain
Expatriate footballers in Spain
French expatriate sportspeople in Germany
Expatriate footballers in Germany
Expatriate footballers in Malta
Expatriate footballers in the United Arab Emirates
Expatriate footballers in Bahrain
Footballers from Seine-Saint-Denis
Black French sportspeople